Vaughn Samuel "Buddy" Alliston Jr. (December 14, 1933 – October 1, 2021) was a professional American football player who played the positions of guard and linebacker. He played college football at the University of Mississippi before being drafted by the Green Bay Packers of the National Football League (NFL) in the 15th round of the 1956 NFL Draft. Alliston first played professionally in the Canadian Football League (CFL) with the Winnipeg Blue Bombers. In 1956, he was the runner-up for the CFL's Most Outstanding Lineman Award. After years of military service, he played in the American Football League (AFL) for the Denver Broncos in 1960.

Early career
Alliston played high school football at Florence High School as a fullback. He also contributed on special teams, blocking 21 punts over the course of his high school career. In 1951, he blocked five punts in a single game.

In college, he played for the Ole Miss Rebels from 1952 to 1955. As a rookie in 1952, Alliston played as a guard on Ole Miss' rookie "B team". He went on to play as both a left and right guard for the Rebels in the following seasons. In 1954, Alliston became known as a quick player who was able to easily tackle opponents on the defensive side of the ball.

By his senior season, Ole Miss head coach Johnny Vaught considered Alliston to be a contender for All-American honors and the Associated Press expected him to be one of "the best guards of 1955". The Associated Press went on to recognize Alliston several times throughout the season on their "SEC checklist of stars today". At the conclusion of the season, Alliston received a variety of honors, including second-team All-SEC and an honorable mention on the All-American team. He was also selected as an honorable mention for both best offensive and best defensive guard in his conference among a poll of SEC coaches. He was voted "Colonel Rebel" by the Ole Miss student body in December 1955. The Ole Miss Rebels defeated the TCU Horned Frogs 14–13 in the 1956 Cotton Bowl Classic, with Alliston being named the best lineman of the game.

Professional career 

The Green Bay Packers of the National Football League selected Alliston in the 15th round of the 1956 NFL Draft with the 176th overall pick, but he didn't play for the Packers. Instead, Alliston played for the Winnipeg Blue Bombers of the Canadian Football League in all sixteen regular season games during their 1956 season, recording two interceptions and a fumble recovery. He was named a Western Interprovincial Football Union all-star at the offensive guard position during his rookie season. Alliston was also named a runner-up for the CFL's Most Outstanding Lineman Award.

After his rookie season in the CFL, he took a break from professional football to join the United States Air Force. While with the Air Force, he was a player on the Eglin Air Force Base team which won the 1958 Shrimp Bowl against the Brooke Army Medical Center. Alliston rejoined the Blue Bombers in 1959 but played in only one game. In 1960, Alliston initially joined the Oakland Raiders in their training camp before moving to the Denver Broncos. Alliston played in eleven regular season games for the Broncos as a linebacker. He retired after the 1960 season. Alliston died on October 1, 2021, at the age of 87.

References

External links
 

1933 births
2021 deaths
American football fullbacks
American football guards
American football linebackers
American players of Canadian football
Canadian football guards
Denver Broncos (AFL) players
Oakland Raiders players
Ole Miss Rebels football players
Winnipeg Blue Bombers players
Players of American football from Jackson, Mississippi
Players of Canadian football from Jackson, Mississippi